Tadiparru, is a village in East Godavari district of Andhra Pradesh, India.

References

Villages in East Godavari district